The 2010–11 East Superleague (known as the Bukta Teamwear East Superleague for sponsorship reasons) was the 10th season of the East Superleague, the top tier of league competition for SJFA East Region member clubs.

The season began on 21 August 2010. Bo'ness United were the reigning champions and became the first club to successfully defend their Superleague title. As champions they entered the First Round of the 2011–12 Scottish Cup.

Teams

To East Superleague 
Promoted from East Premier League

 Tayport
 Forfar West End

From East Superleague 
Relegated to East Premier League

 Whitburn Juniors
 Glenrothes

League table

Results

References

6
East Superleague seasons